Meiacanthus atrodorsalis, the forktail blenny, is a species of combtooth blenny found in coral reefs in the western Pacific ocean.  This species grows to a length of  TL.  This venomous species can also be found in the aquarium trade.  It is also known as the eyelash harptail-blenny, poison-fang blenny or the yellowtail poison-fang blenny.

References

External links
 

atrodorsalis
Fish of the Pacific Ocean
Fish described in 1877
Taxa named by Albert Günther